Anna Caterina Gonzaga, later Anna Juliana O.S.M. (16 November 1566 – 3 August 1621) was an Archduchess of Austria who became a Religious Sister of the Servite Order after the death of her husband, the Archduke Ferdinand II of Austria. A cause for her canonization is open but has not advanced since the 17th century.

Early life
She was born Anna Caterina Gonzaga in Mantua on 16 November 1566 to Guglielmo Gonzaga, Duke of Mantua, and to his wife, Eleonora of Austria, one of their three children. Her godfather was Philip II of Spain. Despite their noble standing, Anna Catherina was raised in a pious Catholic household, and Eleanor was particularly fond of the Blessed Virgin Mary. Legend has it that as an infant, Anna would be given a rosary by her parents to quiet her down.

At about age 5, Anna Caterina became severely ill and nearly died. She contracted a high fever and her extremities began to swell. For two years she was ill. Finally her parents appealed to the Virgin Mary with deep prayer, promising to raise Anne as a child of Mary if she lived on. Soon Anne became healthy again. Anne's parents told her of the Virgin Mary's intervention on her behalf and the promise they had made. From there out Eleanor educated and guided Anne Catherine in the cultivation of devotion to Mary. Throughout childhood Anne Catherine displayed a consistent sense of piety.

At age 9, Anna Caterina was reported to have received a vision of the Virgin Mary. One evening her room became immersed in a bright light and Mary appeared and spoke to her. While she recognized the woman before her as Mary, she was unable to understand what was she was told. It would only be years later that she understood the message. This vision doubled her long-standing desire to become a nun.

Unexpected marriage
In 1580, Ferdinand II, Archduke of Austria, lost his wife, Philippine. She was of the Welser family, who were not royalty, but only patrician of Augsburg and part of Imperial nobility (1532). Although the couple had two sons together, neither were eligible to succeed Ferdinand as archduke, except in the unlikely scenario where all legitimate male cousins were extinct. This prodded Ferdinand to seek remarriage.

Ferdinand's sister, Madeleine, suggested he consider marrying her niece Anna Caterina. On 1 January 1582 Ferdinand asked Duke William for his daughter's hand in marriage, to which William consented. Though she realized this would postpone her calling to a religious order, Anna respected her parents' wishes and voiced no objection to the marriage.

Before leaving Mantua for Innsbruck, in Austria, Anna Caterina asked that her father fulfill some requests. First was a request to release 15 prisoners in celebration of her departure. Second was a request to donate money to 15 beggars. Third was a request to provide interior furnishings at 15 churches. William agreed to each request.

Growing family
On 14 May 1582, at age 15, Anna Caterina was married to Ferdinand in Innsbruck and became Archduchess of Austria. In their first three years of marriage Anna gave birth to three daughters — Eleanor (b. 1583), Marie (b. 1584), and Anna (b. 1585 - 1618). Eleanor died in her infancy; Anna would go on to marry Matthias, King of Hungary and Bohemia, later Holy Roman Emperor.

While Ferdinand loved his daughters, he wished for a son to succeed him. He soon realized this should never come to pass and gave way to fits of anger over the dilemma. Eventually Ferdinand would come to accept the situation and return to reason. As a way of rectifying his years of resentment and temper, he gave his wife the Chateau of Wohlgemutheium and the Fortress of Thaur. In turn, Anne was a dutiful wife who cared for Ferdinand throughout several illnesses. Ferdinand died in 1595.

Widowhood
Aside from her considerable grief, Anna was now responsible for the Innsbruck palace, filled with a great deal of servants and two young daughters. But Anne took this time to redouble her devotion to God and Mary. With Ferdinand, Anna would often wear a royal crown and fine jewelry in order to satisfy him. However, following his death, she retired her crown for a black veil and wore a rosary around her neck. Despite her enormous wealth, Anne’s goal was to completely do away with worldly pleasures.

In her palace Anne lived in small quarters adjacent to a large chapel she had built since Ferdinand’s death, the door connecting the two via a secret hallway. Her room was quite simple, the bed made of very hard wood with one thin sheet to cover with.  She abdicated primary care of her two daughters to the Baroness of Brandes.

The atmosphere at the palace took on the feel of a religious cloister, where the hub of everyone’s universe revolved around religious piety and devotion. Anna was, in her own way, now carrying out a semi-monastic lifestyle which she had long desired. She would fast every Friday, permitting her health could withstand it.

Anna came to realize that she should allot her considerable wealth to others, and so she gave large sums to the Church for the poor, keeping some for her own family. She began to feed the poor at her palace and would serve them personally. Anna also made many visits to the sick and dying, always with her daughters, to administer medicines and to care for them. She was known to give alms everywhere she went, turning nobody in need away. She donated especially large sums to religious institutions in the Innsbruck and Mantua areas, often heralded as an informal mother to the needy for her generosity.

Visions of Mary

Through the years Anne reportedly had a number of visions from the Virgin Mary. In 1606, on the Feast of the Annunciation and in her chapel in prayer, Anne purportedly received another such visit from Mary instructing her to build a convent there in Innsbruck for the Servants of Mary, Religious Sisters of the Servite Third Order founded by St. Juliana Falconieri in the 14th century, of which she was to be a member. With the blessing of Pope Paul V, Anna proceeded with building. Through prayer Anna received further instruction to build her convent on the grounds of her garden; the first stone was placed on the Feast of the Visitation in 1606.

On 2 July 1607 Anna had the Bishop of Brixen (Christoph IV von Spaur), and her stepson, Maximilian III, Archduke of Austria and Margrave of Burgau, be present for the laying down of the cornerstone. Despite this ceremonial start, many influential people in the region were opposed to the construction. Many personal advisors felt it would deplete the palace's resources. The stresses related to this unforeseen opposition culminated in a dire illness for Anne. Her body became covered in sores and she became bedridden, her doctors fearing for the worst.

Following a personal Mass held for her in her room Anna Caterina allegedly had another vision in which the Virgin Mary appeared, assuring her protection. Anne got out of bed immediately and was completely cured of her ailment, vowing to accomplish the project no matter the odds. One day, during construction, a landslide occurred as laborers were working onsite, burying one worker. After considerable time had passed, the others located his body and were astonished to find he was not even hurt. This incident quieted much of the opposition to the building of the convent, seen by many as a miracle. The story goes that the project would surely bankrupt Anna, but miraculously the money was always there no matter the expense.

Religious life and veneration
Upon the completion of the convent, Anna entered the community and took the Servite religious habit, along with the name Anna Juliana, in honor of the foundress of the Order. It was there that she died in 1621.

Immediately after her death, devotion to Anna as a saint began to grow. In 1693 a process for her canonization was opened by the Bishop of Brixen/Bressanone of the time, Count Johann Franz von Khuen zu Liechtenberg. The cause, however, has never advanced.

Ancestry

References

External sources

 Dourche, Joachim M. / Schenk, Jessie (translator)  A Servant of Mary: Anne Juliana of Gonzaga, Archduchess of Austria, Third Order Servite (1566-1621). Sisters, Servants of Mary, Ladysmith, Wisconsin 1995. ISBN N/A.

1566 births
1621 deaths
Nobility of Mantua
Italian emigrants to Austria
Austrian royal consorts
Austrian duchesses
Italian duchesses
Anna Juliana
16th-century Italian nobility
17th-century Italian nobility
Servite tertiaries
17th-century Italian Roman Catholic religious sisters and nuns
Austrian Roman Catholic religious sisters and nuns
Italian Servants of God
17th-century venerated Christians
Daughters of monarchs